The 2019 Mexican League season was the 95th season in the history of the Mexican League in baseball. It was contested by 16 teams, evenly divided in North and South zones. The season started on 4 April with the series between Sultanes de Monterrey and Leones de Yucatán and ended on 2 October with the last game of the Serie del Rey, where Acereros de Monclova defeated Leones de Yucatán to win the championship.

Standings

Postseason

League leaders

Awards

References

Mexican League season
Mexican League season
Mexican League seasons